Christ the King (Vita et Pax) is an architecturally notable former priory of the Olivetan order in Bramley Road, Cockfosters, north London.

It was founded in 1930 by Dom Constantine Bosschaerts, formerly a monk of the Belgian Province of the Cassinese Congregation of the Primitive Observance. The building is dated to 1940 and its design credited to Bosschaerts in Pevsner.

Part of the building was later the Benedictine Centre for Spirituality, and is now the Cockfosters Spirituality Centre.

The parish church of the Parish of Christ The King in Cockfosters occupies part of the building which was intended to form the parish hall for a larger church. Since 2014 the parish has been administered by the Chemin Neuf Community.

References

External links 

Cockfosters
Monasteries in London
Art Deco architecture in London
Olivetan monasteries
Buildings and structures completed in 1940
Oakwood, London